This is a partial list of temperature phenomena that have been labeled as heat waves, listed in order of occurrence.

Before 1901 
 1540 European drought - Extreme drought and heatwave lasting 11 months in Europe.
 July 1757 heatwave – Europe, hottest summer in 500 years before 2003.
 1896 Eastern North America heat wave – killed 1,500 people in August 1896.
 1900 – historical heatwave of the center of Argentina between the first eight days of February 1900 known as "the week of fire" affected the cities of Buenos Aires and Rosario with temperatures of up to  but with a very high index of humidity that elevated the sensation of heat to  severely affecting the health of people and causing at least 478 fatalities.

20th century 
 1901 – 1901 eastern United States heat wave killed 9,500 in the Eastern United States.
 1906 – during the 1906 United Kingdom heat wave which began in August and lasted into September broke numerous records. On September 2 temperatures reached , which still holds the September record, however some places beat their local record during September 1911 and September 2016.
 1911 – 1911 Eastern North America heat wave killed between 380 and 2,000 people. 
It took 79 years for temperature higher to be recorded in the United Kingdom during 1990 United Kingdom heat wave.
 1911 – 41,072 deaths were reported during a heat wave in France.
 1913 – in July, the hottest heat wave ever struck California.
 1921 – Hottest July on record across Eastern Canada and parts of the Northeastern US, part of a very warm year in those places. Parts of the United Kingdom also saw recording breaking heat, also part of a very warm year. The year of 1921 was the warmest on record at the time but has since been eclipsed by 15 other years.
 1923–1924 – during a period of 160 such days from 31 October 1923 to 7 April 1924, the Western Australian town of Marble Bar reached .
 1930s – Almost every year from 1930 to 1938 featured historic heat waves and droughts somewhere in North America, part of the Dust Bowl years.
 1936 – 1936 North American heat wave during the Dust Bowl, followed one of the coldest winters on record—the 1936 North American cold wave. Massive heat waves across North America were persistent in the 1930s, many mid-Atlantic/Ohio valley states recorded their highest temperatures during July 1934.
 1950s – Prolonged severe drought and heat wave occurred in the early 1950s throughout the central and southern United States. Every year from 1952 to 1955 featured major heat waves across North America. In some areas it was drier than during the Dust Bowl and the heat wave in most areas was within the top five on record. The heat was particularly severe in 1954 with 22 days of temperatures exceeding  covering significant parts of eleven states. On 14 July, the thermometer reached  at East St. Louis, Illinois, which remains the record highest temperature for that state.
 October 1952 – Romania was hit by very hot weather. Temperatures reached  on 2 October, with Bucharest reaching . Temperatures on the night of 2–3 October were also just under .
 1955 – 1955 United Kingdom heat wave was a period of hot weather that was accompanied by drought. In some places it was the worst drought on record, more severe than 1976 and 1995.
 1960 – on 2 January, Oodnadatta, South Australia hit  degrees, the highest temperature ever recorded in the Southern Hemisphere and Oceania.
 1972 – heat waves of 1972 in New York and Northeastern United States were significant. Almost 900 people died; the heat conditions lasted almost 16 days, aggravated by very high humidity levels.
 1976 – 1976 United Kingdom heat wave was one of the hottest in living memory and was marked by constant blue skies from May until September when dramatic thunderstorms signalled the heat wave's end.
 1980 – estimated 1,000 people died in the 1980 United States heat wave and drought, which impacted the central and eastern United States. Temperatures were highest in the southern plains. From June through September, temperatures remained above  all but two days in Kansas City, Missouri. The Dallas/Fort Worth area experienced 42 consecutive days with high temperatures above , with temperatures reaching  at Wichita Falls, Texas on 28 June. Economic losses were $20 billion (1980 dollars).
 1981 – August 1981 heat wave in the Pacific Northwest.
The hundred-degree readings were accompanied by very dry conditions associated with drought affecting the Corn Belt States and Upper Midwest. The heat also affected the Southeastern U.S. and the Mid-Atlantic states as well that same summer. New York Times represented articles about the heat waves of 1983 affecting the central United States. This heat wave was associated with the I-94 derecho.
 1983 – United Kingdom experienced a heatwave during July 1983. This was the hottest month ever recorded until it was beaten in 2006.

 1987 – prolonged heat wave from 20 to 31 July in Greece, with more than 1,000 deaths in the area of Athens. Moreover, humidity was high and wind speeds low, contributing to human discomfort, even during the night.
 1988 – intense heat spells in combination with the drought of 1988, reminiscent of the dust bowl years caused deadly results across the United States. Official estimates report that 5,000 to 10,000 people died because of constant heat across the United States. Some estimates put total deaths at close to 17,000.
This led to one of the hottest Augusts on record, records going back to 1659.
The lack of emergency cooling facilities and inadequate response from civic authorities to the senior population, particularly in lower income neighborhoods in Chicago and other Midwestern cities, lead to at least 778 deaths—mostly which were African American Chicagoans. A series of damaging derechos occurred on the periphery of the hot air dome.
 1995 – United Kingdom experienced its 3rd hottest summer since 1659. August was the hottest on record since 1659. The summer was also the driest on record since 1766.
 1997 – United Kingdom experienced its 3rd major heatwave in 7 years with August 1997 being one of the hottest on record.
 1999 – heat wave and drought in the eastern United States during the summer of 1999. Rainfall shortages resulted in worst drought on record for Maryland, Delaware, New Jersey, and Rhode Island. The state of West Virginia was declared a disaster area.  were consumed by fire as of mid-August. Record heat throughout the country resulted in 502 deaths nationwide. There were many deaths in urban centers of the Midwest.
 2000 – in late Summer 2000, a heat wave occurred in the southern United States, breaking many cities' all-time maximum temperature records.

21st century

2001–2009 
 In early August 2001 an intense heatwave hit the eastern seaboard of the United States and neighboring southeastern Canada. For over a week, temperatures climbed above  combined with stifling high humidity.
 In April 2002 a summer-like heat wave in spring affected much of the Eastern United States.
 In July 2002 a heatwave in China killed at least 7 people and resulted in hospitalization of over 3500 people.
 During April 2003 there was a summer-like heatwave that affected the United Kingdom however mainly England and Wales where temperature records were broken.
The European heat wave of 2003 affected much of western Europe, breaking temperature records. Much of the heat was concentrated in France, England and Spain where nearly 15,000 people died.
Many heat records were broken (including the hottest ever July temperature in Great Britain) and many people who experienced the heat waves of 1976 and 2003 drew comparisons with them. Highest average July temperatures were recorded at many locations in Great Britain, Netherlands, Denmark, Sweden and Germany.
 The 2006 North American heat wave affected a wide area of the United States and parts of neighboring Canada during July and August 2006. Over 220 deaths were reported. Temperatures in some parts of South Dakota exceeded . Humidity levels in California were also unusually high, although low compared with normal gulf coast/eastern seaboard summer humidity they were significant enough to cause widespread discomfort. Additionally, the heat wave was associated a series of derechos that produced widespread damage.
 The European heat wave of 2007 affected primarily south-eastern Europe during late June through August. Bulgaria experienced its hottest year on record, with previously unrecorded temperatures above . The 2007 Greek forest fires were associated with the heat wave.
 In January 2008, Alice Springs in Australia's Northern Territory recorded ten consecutive days of temperatures above  with the average temperature for that month being . In March 2008, Adelaide, South Australia experienced maximum temperatures of above  for fifteen consecutive days, seven days more than the previous longest stretch of  days. The March 2008 heat wave also included eleven consecutive days above . The heat wave was especially notable because it occurred in March, an autumn month, in which Adelaide averages only 2.3 days above .
 The eastern United States experienced an early summer heat wave from 6–10 June 2008 with record temperatures. There was a heat wave in Southern California beginning late June, which contributed to widespread fires. On 6 July, a renewed heat wave was forecast, which was expected to affect the entire state.
During this heat wave Victoria suffered from large bushfires which killed 173 people and destroyed more than 2,500 homes. There were also over half a million people without power as the heatwave blew transformers and the power grid was overloaded.
 In August 2009, Argentina experienced a period of unusual and exceptionally hot weather during 24–30 August, during the Southern Hemisphere winter, just a month before Spring, when an unusual and unrecorded winter heat wave hit the country. Several records were broken. Even though normal high temperatures for late August are in the lower , readings topped  degrees at midweek, then topped out above  degrees during the weekend. As per the Meteorological Office of Argentina, August 2009 has been the warmest month during winter since official measurements began.

2010 

 The Northern Hemisphere summer heat wave of 2010 affected many areas across the Northern Hemisphere, especially parts of Northeastern China and European Russia.
 Starting in May 2010, records were being set. On 26 May, at Mohenjo-daro, Sindh province in Pakistan a national record high temperature of  occurred.
 In June 2010, Eastern Europe experienced very warm conditions. Ruse, Bulgaria hit  on the 13th making it the warmest spot in Europe. The heat came from the Sahara desert and was not associated with rain. This helped the situation with high water levels in that part of the continent. On the 14th, several cities were once again above the  mark even though they did not break records. The only cities in Bulgaria breaking records were Musala peak hitting  and Elhovo hitting  . Although it was not a record, this was the highest temperature recorded in the country.
 From 4 to 9 July 2010, the majority of the American East Coast, from the Carolinas to Maine, was gripped in a severe heat wave. Philadelphia, New York, Baltimore, Washington, Raleigh, and even Boston eclipsed . Philadelphia and New York eclipsed  for the first time since 2001. Frederick, Maryland, and Newark, New Jersey, among others exceeded  for four days in a row.

2011 

 The 2011 North American heat wave brought record heat to the Midwestern United States, Eastern Canada, and much of the Eastern Seaboard.
 A record-breaking heat wave hit Southwestern Asia in late July and early August 2011, with temperatures in Iraq exceeding , and an "asphalt-melting, earth-parching, brain-scrambling heat of midsummer" in Tbilisi, Georgia. The extreme heat inspired conspiracy theories of the government corruption in Iraq and retaliation from the United States government; and, in Georgia, the Apocalypse, mutant locusts caused by Chernobyl, snakes imported by unseen enemies, and sun spots.
 Most parts of the United Kingdom experienced an Indian summer between September and October 2011.

2012 

In March 2012, the Midwest experienced one of the biggest heat waves of all time.  
 In late June 2012, much of North America began experiencing a heat wave, as heat spread east from the Rocky Mountains. During the heat wave, the June 2012 North American derecho (one within a series) caused violent storms that downed trees and power lines, leaving 3 million people in the eastern U. S. without power on 30 June. The heat lasted until mid-August in some parts of the country.

2013 

 The Australian summer of 2012–2013, known as the Angry Summer or Extreme Summer, resulted in 123 weather records being broken over a 90-day period, including the hottest day ever recorded for Australia as a whole, the hottest January on record, the hottest summer average on record, and a record seven days in row when the whole continent averaged above . Single-day temperature record were broken in dozens of towns and cities, as well as single-day rainfall records, and several rivers flooded to new record highs. From 28 December 2012 through at least 9 January 2013 Australia has faced its most severe heatwave in over 80 years, with a large portion of the nation recording high temperature reading above  or greater in some areas, a couple of spots have also neared . This extreme heat has also resulted in a 'flash' drought across southern and central areas of the country and has sparked several massive wildfires due to periodic high winds.
 In late June 2013, an intense heat wave struck the Southwestern United States. On 30 June, Death Valley, California hit  which is the hottest temperature ever recorded on Earth during the month of June.
 Around Canada Day 2013, the same heatwave that hit the Southwestern United States moved north and hit southern British Columbia, Washington and Oregon. Temperatures in BC hit  in Lytton on 1 July 2013, and on 2 July 2013, the city of Penticton hit , with both Summerland and Osoyoos hitting the same.
 In China from July to August 2013, the South continued to experience an unusually severe heat wave with exceptionally high temperatures. In multiple regions of Zhejiang, Chongqing, Shanghai, Hunan, and other areas the temperatures soared to over 40 degrees Celsius and lasted for a long time. Sustained high temperatures caused many people, especially the elderly to get heatstroke or sunstroke, seriously affecting millions of lives. Many areas throughout China endured record high temperatures resulting in multiple continuous meteorological departments issued high-temperature orange or red alerts. 2013 saw a wide range of abnormally hot temperatures not seen for the past 60 years of national meteorological records dating back to 1951.
 In July 2013, the United Kingdom experienced the warmest July since 2006.
 The Argentina heatwave of 2013 was a historical phenomenon that occurred from 11 December 2013 to 2 January 2014 in the north and center of the country, as well as in northern Patagonia. It was the longest heat wave experienced in Argentina since records began in 1906 affecting many cities throughout the country. For the first time since the creation of the heat alarm system, a red level alert was issued for several days consecutive for both the city of Buenos Aires and the city of Rosario, which are the cities for which the National Meteorological Service conducts heat waves. From 11 December began to register a marked increase in temperatures, especially the maximum in a vast area of the central and northern Patagonian region, affecting southern Córdoba, southern Santa Fe, southern Entre Ríos, much of the province of Buenos Aires, La Pampa, east of Mendoza, east of Neuquén and Río Negro. From day 19 this anomalous situation began to expand towards the north of Argentina and returned to intensify on the central part, arriving to affect to 18 provinces, yielding the same towards 30 December in the central part and between 1 and 2 January in the extreme north of the country with the passage of a cold front that produced a change of mass of air. The long persistence of this heat wave (22 days), made the event an exceptional one, breaking several brands in regard to more consecutive days with minimum and maximum temperatures above the average in several meteorological stations of the affected zone. The National Meteorological Service communicated, through its daily reports, reports on the development of the heat wave. The extensive heat wave severely affected the health of thousands of people who needed medical assistance during those days, the historic heat wave caused at least 1,877 deaths in different points of the center and north of the country.

2015 

Between April to May 2015, a heat wave occurred in India, killing more than 2,200 people in that country's different geographical regions. Andhra Pradesh was hardest hit, with 1,636 people dying from the heat since mid-April, a government statement said. A further 561 people have died in neighboring Telangana.
Starting 20–21 June 2015, a severe heat wave has killed more than 2,500 people in Karachi, Pakistan.
Between 28 June – 3 July 2015, in the Northwest United States, and southern British Columbia, a heat wave
Between 30 June – 5 July 2015, a heat wave, brought upon by a Spanish plume, occurred in Western Europe, which pushed hot temperatures from Morocco to England. Temperatures in England reached , beating the previous July record from 2006 but the all-time record of  stayed unbeaten.

From late June to mid-September 2015, . With temperatures above , new record temperatures have been measured since the start of weather recording in many locations. The Maghreb Mediterranean coast, south-western, central and south-eastern Europe experienced one of the biggest heat waves of recent decades. 
In August 2015, a heat wave affected much of the Middle East causing almost a hundred deaths in Egypt. Temperatures reached above  in Iraq and Qatar.

2016 

2016 was the warmest year on record.

During June 2016, record heat appeared in Arizona, southern Nevada, and southern California. Burbank, California reached , Phoenix, Arizona reached , Yuma, Arizona reached  and Tucson, Arizona reached , its warmest temperature in more than 20 years, on 19 June.
In July 2016, Mitribah, Kuwait reached  and Basra, Iraq reached . These are the highest temperatures ever recorded in the Eastern Hemisphere and on planet Earth outside of Death Valley.
2016 Indian heatwave was a record heatwave in April and May of that year. Over 160 people died with 330 million affected to some degree. There were also water shortages with drought worsening the impact of the heat wave. In India, the month of May is typically one of the hottest and driest. In 2016, the heat came early, with 111 heat-related casualties reported by 8 April 2016 the heat was coupled with drought which further devastation. Schools were shut down in Odisha and Telangana weeks ahead of summer holidays. Hospitals stopped performing surgeries. A ban on daytime (9am - 6pm) cooking was imposed to prevent accidental fires.

2017 

From 25–27 January 2017, Chile experienced a period of intense heat, with temperatures peaking on 26 January. The event was concentrated between the Metropolitan Region of Santiago and La Araucanía Region, being more intense in the region of Maule and Biobío Region. The meteorological phenomenon broke the records of maximum temperatures ever recorded in the cities of Santiago, Chillán, Concepción and Quillón, the latter being the highest maximum temperature recorded nationwide since data exists: .
In June 2017 again, a heatwave in Iran broke record high temperature. On 28 June 2017, the city of Jask had a dew point of  degrees, which is rare.
Also, on 21 June 2017, the United Kingdom experienced a heat wave where temperatures reached the hottest since 28 June 1976, hitting 34.5˚C at London Heathrow Airport.
June 29, 2017, Greece heat wave - hot air mass from Sahara Desert extended to the Balkans resulting in temperatures of 42˚C to 45˚C for three consecutive days.
In July 2017, most parts of China experienced a severe heat wave. Additional record highs were set in Chongqing, Xi'an, Hangzhou, Hefei, Xujiahui Station of Shanghai, Nanjing, and Wuhan.
In September 2017 a heat wave affected a large portion of the Eastern United States; it is notable for producing unusually hot temperatures the latest in a calendar year in places. The heat wave also affected parts of Eastern Canada.

2018 

In May and June 2018, a heat wave affected Pakistan and a significant portion of India. At least 65 people have died due to the heat as of 28 May. The health dangers to a large part of the population are exacerbated by the then-ongoing Ramadan fast.
2018 British Isles heat wave. In April 2018, a heat wave affected the United Kingdom and Ireland. In July 2018, many areas of the UK saw temperatures exceed 30 degrees for over 15 days in a row, and other areas still affected by a heat wave. The hot weather continued into early August before temperatures returned closer to the average during the second half of the month.
 2018 North American heat wave. The heat wave started in Mexico in late May 2018. By June 2018, the Mexican government issued a state of emergency to more than 300 municipalities. In early July 2018, the heat wave in Quebec, Canada caused about 74 deaths. In July, the heat wave in Southern California caused many power outages, where over 34,000 Los Angeles customers serviced by LADWP had no power for over one week. In southwestern states such as Arizona and Colorado were above .
 2018 Japan heat wave. In mid-July 2018, the heat wave in Japan arrived after a major flood. It caused over 22,000 hospitalization and 80 deaths.
 2018 European drought and heat waves. Much of Europe experienced above-average temperatures and drought, which resulted in wildfires in Sweden and wildfires in Greece.

2019

 Australian heat wave
 From 25 December 2018, Australia was faced with constant record-breaking heatwaves with few breaks. December 2018 was recorded as the hottest December on record, while New South Wales had their warmest January since 2011. Adelaide recorded its hottest day on record on 24 January, surpassing the previous record from 1939, reaching  at 3:36pm local time, and many settlements across South Australia set new records the same day. At least one man, 90 feral horses and 2,000 bats died, while 25,000 homes lost power.
 Melbourne was forecast to have its hottest day since the 2009 Black Saturday bushfires on 25 January (although this failed to eventuate), while over 200,000 homes across Victoria lost power due to load shedding. On 25 January Melbourne had its hottest day of either January or February: .
 On 25 January the temperature of The Treasure Coast reached .
 In late-May 2019, an unusually strong early-season heat wave affected the southeastern United States, breaking all-time May record high temperatures in several cities. Many locations also broke the record for the earliest-in-season  temperature.
Also in late-May, an early-season heat wave affected parts of Japan. The town of Saroma in Hokkaido reached , the highest May temperature ever recorded anywhere in Japan.

The Indian and Pakistani media reported dozens of deaths due to the heat wave.
 2019 European heat wave: Starting from 25 June, very hot air masses from the Sahara desert moved over Europe, leading to heat advisories in several European countries, including France, Germany and the UK. The extent and intensity of the heat wave was unusual for its earliness in the summer season. In France, numerous cities broke the old all-time national record of  set in Conqueyrac in 2003. One month later, a similar event occurred, which also broke high temperature records in cities across several northwestern European countries. On 27 August, the Royal Netherlands Meteorological Institute (KNMI) officially confirmed that the Netherlands were experiencing yet another heat wave when a temperature of 30 degrees was measured in De  at 12.40. It was the fourth time ever since recordings began in 1901 that the country experienced two national heat waves in a single year. The same day, the Royal Meteorological Institute (KMI/IRM) declared the third heat wave of 2019 in Belgium. Since official temperature readings began, it has happened only once before (in 1947) that three heat waves were detected in a single year.
 A prolonged drought and heat wave affected the eastern United States from September to October 2019. September was one of the warmest and driest on record in many locations. All-time record high temperatures for October are also broken in numerous cities.
The heat exacerbated the 2019–20 Australian bushfire season.

2020

A late spring heat wave hit Northern New England and Eastern Canada: On May 27, Montreal broke its all-time May record high, reaching , which was also the second-highest temperature ever recorded in the city. Nearby Ottawa and Burlington, Vermont reached  on the same day. In mid-June, a second heat wave hit the same regions. Montreal and Burlington reached  for 6 consecutive days, one of the longest streaks on record in these locations. In New Brunswick, numerous cities broke all-time June record highs, with the hot spots Bathurst and Miramichi hitting . The heat wave, combined with abnormally dry conditions, led to numerous forest fires in the province of Quebec. The heat wave continued into July, where Toronto, Ottawa, and Montreal recorded their second hottest July on record.
Siberia heat wave: A Russian heat wave smashed an all-time record high in one Siberian town on June 20, reaching a scorching  possibly the hottest temperature on record so far north in the Arctic, continuing an off-the-charts warm year in what is typically one of coldest places on Earth. If that reading is found to be correct, that would break the town's all-time record of  set on July 25, 1988. Temperature records in Verkhoyansk date to 1885.
 Western United States: Period of intense heat throughout the Western and Midwestern United States, starting in early mid-August. Death Valley reached  on August 16, the highest temperature since a reported  at the same location in July 1913. If this temperature is verified, it will be one of the highest temperatures recorded on earth.

2021

 Around mid-February, a jet-stream of Sahara dust brought a winter heatwave in Europe with daily temperatures nearly similar to max high during spring.
 On May 20, the May record  was reported north of the Arctic Circle at 67.6° North, 53° East. The 2021 Russia heatwave and drought caused the 2021 Siberia wildfires.
 From June 3 to 6 the northern Great Plains and southern Canadian Prairies experienced a heat wave.
 In late June, the 2021 Western North America heat wave occurred, causing temperatures to soar above  in the Pacific Northwest. All-time record high temperatures were recorded in cities such as Portland  and Seattle . Lytton, British Columbia reached , surpassing the day prior , which had exceeded the all-time high temperature ever recorded in Canada.
 In June 18 to July 18 in Kouvola Finland, the Finnish heat wave record broke: already 31 consecutive heat days came full.
 in the last week of July, a heat wave in Turkey, Greece, Italy and other countries in the region has begun. On August 11, the highest temperature ever in Europe, was recorded in Floridia, Sicily.
 In July, a heat wave combined with drought, low natural gas production, and COVID-19 delays to cause widespread power outages across the Middle East, with protests in Iraq, Iran, and Lebanon.

2022 

Starting in Late March 2022, India began experiencing one of the hottest March–April periods on record.
A major heat wave affected the United States throughout May. Three residents in a senior building died on May 14 in Chicago due to the intense heat, because the AC wouldn't turn on.
During mid-June 2022, a record-breaking heat wave affected half of the United States. Record-high temperatures were set from California to Texas on June 13. On June 14, dangerous heat spread to the Midwest, South, and the Plains.
In late June 2022, Japan saw the worst heatwave in 150 years.
The 2022 European heat waves affected much of Western Europe and the United Kingdom. Temperatures in Spain reached . The United Kingdom saw the first red extreme heat warning to ever be issued in the country, causing it to be declared a national emergency on 15 July. A report from the Met Office suggests that temperatures may have reached  at Coningsby on 19 July, which is the first time the United Kingdom has exceeded .
China has suffered several heat waves in 2022.

See also
 List of cold waves
 List of Indian heat waves
 List of marine heatwaves
 List of severe weather phenomena

References

Heat waves
Heat